The 1982–83 James Madison Dukes men's basketball team represented James Madison University during the 1982–83 NCAA Division I men's basketball season. The Dukes, led by 11th-year head coach Lou Campanelli, played their home games at the on-campus Convocation Center and were members of the southern division of the Eastern Collegiate Athletic Conference (ECAC).

The Dukes finished the season with a 20–11 (6–3 ECAC South) record and won the ECAC South tournament. The Dukes received an automatic bid to the 1983 NCAA Division I men's basketball tournament for their third ever and third consecutive appearance in the tournament. In the NCAA Tournament, the tenth-seeded Dukes beat West Virginia in the first round before falling to North Carolina in the second round.

Previous season

Roster

Schedule

|-
!colspan=9 style=|Regular Season

|-
!colspan=9 style=| ECAC South tournament

|-
!colspan=9 style=| NCAA tournament

Source:

Awards and honors
Dan Ruland – CAA co-Player of the Year

References

James Madison Dukes men's basketball seasons
James Madison
James Madison
James Madison Men's Basketball
James Madison Men's Basketball